The Meridian Metropolitans were a Cotton States League baseball team based in Meridian, Mississippi, United States that played from 1912 to 1913. Orth Collins and Danny Clark played for them.

References

Meridian, Mississippi
Defunct minor league baseball teams
Defunct baseball teams in Mississippi
Professional baseball teams in Mississippi
Baseball teams established in 1912
1912 establishments in Mississippi
Baseball teams disestablished in 1913
Defunct Cotton States League teams